The Great Whale River is a river in Nunavik, Quebec, Canada. It flows from Lac Saint-Luson through Lac Bienville west to Hudson Bay.

Great Whale River also has a branch originating from Caniapiscau Reservoir. For canoeists, this is the easiest access (a bridge on the Trans-Taiga Road at Lac Montausier ).

Both the northern village of Kuujjuarapik, whose inhabitants are mostly Inuit, and the Cree village of Whapmagoostui are situated at the mouth of the river, near the site of the former RCAF Station Great Whale River. The villages were formerly known collectively as "Great Whale River" and "Poste-de-la-Baleine."

The portion between Lake Bienville and the mouth of the Coats River has also been called Abchigamich River, but this name was dropped in 1946 by the Commission de géographie du Québec. Also, the name has often been wrongly translated into French as Rivière de la Grande Baleine (not until 1962 did the Commission de géographie du Québec officially adopt the current Grande rivière de la Baleine).

History

The Great Whale River was a place favored by the Cree and Inuit for hunting beluga long before the arrival of Europeans. Even though both were nomadic, the mouth of the river was often an encampment site and served as unofficial border.

The name of the river was recorded in 1744 in the logbooks of Hudson's Bay Company employees Thomas Mitchell and John Longland, while exploring the bay's coast. The entry for July 25 made the first mention of the "Great White Whail  River". It may have come from the Cree Whapmagoostui, meaning River of the Whale, and referring to the hunting of white whale or beluga there.

In the early 1970s, the state-owned provincial power utility Hydro-Québec planned to construct three hydroelectric power stations on the Great Whale River as a part of the James Bay Project. Although detailed planning for the project was only begun in 1986, opposition from Crees, Inuit, environmental organizations like Greenpeace and the Friends of the Earth and other activists led the Premier of Quebec, Jacques Parizeau, to announce in November 1994, that the project was suspended indefinitely. However, the project may still be revived in the future.

List of lakes on the upper section

Lac Saint-Luson
Lac Girauday
Lac Lamberville
Lac Gournay
Lac Prieur
Lac Cognac
Lac Roman
Lac Poncy
Lac Molleville
Lac Chastenay
Lac Turreau
Lac Naudin
Lac Raguideau
Lac Bourgtalon
Lac Bouvante
Lac Novereau
Lac Decoigne
Lac Jacquemont
Lac Delaroche
Lac Sanchagrin
Lac Danneville
Lac Sablons
Lac Maravat
Lac Ducasse
Lac Laurac
Lac Chastenet
Lac Magne
Lac Maurel
Lac Louet
Lac Wasatimis
Lac Bienville
Lac Paimpoint

Gallery

See also
List of longest rivers of Canada
Little Whale River - running parallel to the Great Whale River about 100 km north
List of Quebec rivers

Sources

The Great Whale Project

Further reading

 Honigmann, John Joseph. Social Networks in Great Whale River; Notes on an Eskimo, Montagnais-Naskapi, and Euro-Canadian Community. [Ottawa]: Dept. of Northern Affairs and National Resources, 1962.
 Johnson, William D. An Exploratory Study of Ethnic Relations at Great Whale River. Ottawa, Canada: Northern Co-ordination and Research Centre, Dept. of Northern Affairs and National Resources, 1962.
 Masty, David Sr. 1991. "Traditional Use of Fish and Other Resources of the Great Whale River Region". Northeast Indian Quarterly. 8, no. 4: 12-14.
 Wills, Richard H. Conflicting Perceptions Western Economics and the Great Whale River Cree. [Canada?]: Tutorial Press, 1984.

External links

The Atlas of Canada - Rivers
General description, map and images
Hydro-Québec and the Great Whale Project. Environmental/development negotiations; stakeholder analysis.
The Great Whale River Expedition 1988
The Great Whale River Expedition 1991
The Great Whale River Expedition 1997
The Great Whale River Expedition 1997 (images)
Mojo Men of the Great Whale
 Acculturation of the Great Whale River Cree Manuscript at Dartmouth College Library

Rivers of Nord-du-Québec
Tributaries of Hudson Bay
Nunavik